The 1972 Wake Forest Demon Deacons football team was an American football team that represented Wake Forest University during the 1972 NCAA University Division football season. In their first and only season under head coach Tom Harper, the Demon Deacons compiled a 2–9 record and finished in a tie for last place in the Atlantic Coast Conference.

Schedule

Roster

Team leaders

References

Wake Forest
Wake Forest Demon Deacons football seasons
Wake Forest Demon Deacons football